Julia Hurley may refer to:

 Julia Hurley (politician) (born 1981), American politician and businesswoman from Tennessee
 Julia Hurley (actress) (1848-1927), American actress